Myripristis robusta, the robust soldierfish, is a species of soldierfish belonging to the genus Myripristis. It can be found in the Western Central Pacific Ocean in Luzon, Philippines and Madang Province, Papua New Guinea. It is named for its robust body. It can be found in protected waters with silty sand and rubble bottoms.

References

robusta
Fish of the Pacific Ocean
Taxa named by David Wayne Greenfield
Taxa named by John Ernest Randall